The 2001 Paris–Nice was the 59th edition of the Paris–Nice cycle race and was held from 11 March to 18 March 2001. The race started in Nevers and finished in Nice. The race was won by Dario Frigo of the Fassa Bortolo team.

General classification

References

2001
2001 in road cycling
2001 in French sport
March 2001 sports events in Europe